The Adelaide Establishment is the name given to the group of wealthy landowners and industrialists who have played a considerable role in the history of South Australia since its foundation in 1836. Based primarily in South Australia's capital Adelaide, the Adelaide Establishment is economically, politically and socially conservative and seeks to preserve a rigid social hierarchy and laissez-faire economic system.

While the power of the Adelaide Establishment has waned over the decades, members continue to play a role in the running of Adelaide and South Australia. 

The name "Adelaide Establishment" is derived from the term "The Establishment", denoted to mean a network of prominent, well-connected people who exercise power.

History 

Following the founding of Adelaide in 1836, wealthy immigrants from England, some of whom were related by blood or marriage, were allowed to appropriate the best land for themselves, building a privileged class of wealthy land owners who were able to exert persuasive political and social influence over South Australia. to the point that historians could claim that these people assumed the influence wielded in their localities by the merchants of the Hanseatic League or the Rialto in Venice. As time passed, these families continued to intermarry, solidifying their control to the point that they "exercised, prior to the second world war, a degree of financial influence and control probably unparalleled by any group in any Australian state". 

Members of the Adelaide Establishment have served as senior members of the Parliament of South Australia, including Premier of South Australia Sir Thomas Playford IV, from 1938 to 1965 usually through the Liberal and Country League. The diversification of South Australia's economy after World War II through attracting large scale manufacturing enterprises to Adelaide led to the waning of power, but the Adelaide Establishment controlled the South Australian Legislative Council until the electoral reform of the late 1960s that abolished the Playmander. 

Examples of Adelaide Establishment families include the:
 Barr Smith family
 Bonython family
 Downer family 
 Morphett families

References

Sources
 Dunstan, D. (1981) Felicia, the political memoirs of Don Dunstan, McMillan: South Melbourne. .
 Jaensch, D. (1986) The Flinders history of South Australia. Political history, Wakefield Press: Adelaide. .
 Jaensch, D. (1977) The Government of South Australia, University of Queensland Press: St Lucia, QLD. .
 Mosler, S. (2011) Heritage Politics in Adelaide, University of Adelaide Press: Adelaide. .
 Whitelock, D. (1977) Adelaide 1836 – 1976, University of Queensland Press: Brisbane. .

History of Adelaide
Politics of South Australia